Welcome, Mr. Washington is a 1944 British drama film directed by Leslie S. Hiscott and starring Barbara Mullen, Donald Stewart and Peggy Cummins. The film was made by British National Films, based on a story by Noel Streatfeild.

Welcome, Mr. Washington was listed as one of the British Film Institute's "75 Most Wanted" lost films for some years. It emerged in early 2016 that a complete print had been  discovered in a locker in London's Cinema Museum. It was screened at BFI Southbank in late January. It was shown on the British TV channel Talking Pictures TV on 13 October 2020.

Premise
During the Second World War, two sisters are left almost penniless by their father's sudden death, and so they decide to lease their estate as an airbase to the newly-arrived American forces.

Cast

References

External links
 BFI 75 Most Wanted entry, with extensive notes
 

1944 films
British drama films
1940s English-language films
Films directed by Leslie S. Hiscott
Films set in England
World War II films made in wartime
1940s rediscovered films
Films with screenplays by Jack Whittingham
British black-and-white films
1944 drama films
Rediscovered British films
Films shot at British National Studios
1940s British films